Rugby in Pakistan may refer to:

 Rugby union in Pakistan
 Rugby league in Pakistan